Camillian Hospital (called also "San Camillo Hospital") - small private hospital in Bangkok (Thailand), founded by catholic missionaries - camillians in 1956 (earlier in 1952 camillians established another "San Camillo Hospital" in Ratchaburi Province). The hospital is located in Watthana district and has general practice and special care facilities.

The hospital is operated by Saint Camillus Foundation of Thailand and has charity programs to treat poor and low income patients.

Camillian hospital employees took active part in overcoming of the 2004 tsunami damage in Thailand setting up mobile clinics for the disaster survivors.

References

Hospitals in Bangkok
Catholic Church in Thailand
Hospitals established in 1956
Watthana district
1956 establishments in Thailand
Private hospitals in Thailand